Nová Cerekev is a market town in the Pelhřimov District in the Vysočina Region of the Czech Republic. It has about 1,100 inhabitants.

Administrative parts
Villages of Částkovice, Chmelná, Markvarec, Myslov, Proseč-Obořiště and Stanovice are administrative parts of Nová Cerekev.

Notable people
Alfréd Justitz (1879–1934), painter and illustrator
Otto Šling (1912–1952), communist politician

References

Populated places in Pelhřimov District
Market towns in the Czech Republic
Jewish communities in the Czech Republic
Shtetls